Great British Menu is a BBC television series in which top British chefs compete for the chance to cook one course of a four-course banquet.

Format
Series one and two were presented by Jennie Bond, the former BBC Royal correspondent, whereby each week, two chefs from a region of the UK create a menu. In series three and four, both narrated by Bond but with no presenter, three chefs from a region of the UK create a menu; only the two with the best scores went through to the Friday judging. In series five and six, the fifth narrated by Bond while the sixth is narrated by Wendy Lloyd, three chefs from a region of the UK create a menu, with in kitchen judging undertaken by a past contestant chef; only the two with the best scores go through to the Friday judging.

In each series, the Friday show is when chefs present all courses of their menu to a judging panel, tasted and judged by Matthew Fort, Prue Leith and Oliver Peyton. One chef each week goes through to the final, where the judges taste the dishes again and award them marks out of ten.

In series one and two, the three dishes that have scored the highest for each course of the finals are then shortlisted for public vote via televoting. In series three and four, the shortlisting rule was dropped, so all dishes scored by the judges are then sent to the public vote. Judges' scores represent one half of the overall score, and public vote represents the other half. The Guardian critic Karina Mantavia in May 2007 criticised the public vote system as incompatible to food that viewers could see onscreen but not taste in-person.

Starting from series five, a fourth judge, usually either a veteran chef or a guest related to a brief, is introduced, replacing public vote. Since series eight, the fourth judge addition extends to regional heats.

Up until series six, the finalists can replace only one course dish of their own menus with a newer one. They can adjust or tweak other dishes but cannot completely change them.

On 28 October 2016, it was confirmed that Prue Leith was leaving the show and would be replaced by Andi Oliver for series 12 in 2017.

On 1 October 2019, Susan Calman was announced as the new presenter for series 15. Filming took place in Stratford-upon-Avon and was completed in November 2019. The show was broadcast in spring 2020. For Christmas 2020 special series and thereafter, Andi Oliver stepped down as a judge and has replaced Calman as the presenter.

On 7 February 2021, it was announced that Rachel Khoo would be joining as a new judge when the series returns in spring 2021.

On 6 September 2021, it was announced that the whole judging panel would be changed with Matthew Fort and Oliver Payton leaving after being on the show since the beginning and Rachel Khoo after one series. The new judging panel will consist of former GBM champion Tom Kerridge, chef and restaurateur Nisha Katona and comedian and food podcaster Ed Gamble.

Series 1 (2006)
The birthday meal for the Queen was on 16 June 2006 and for 300 people, so each dish created had to be suitable for a summer banquet. All recipes have been published in a book by Dorling Kindersley.

Contestants
John Burton Race and Michael Caines (won heat) represent the South West of England
Antony Worrall Thompson and Galton Blackiston (won heat) represent the Midlands and the East of England
Marcus Wareing (won heat)  and Simon Rimmer represent the North of England
Paul Rankin and Richard Corrigan (won heat) represent Northern Ireland
Tom Lewis and Nick Nairn (won heat) represent Scotland
Angela Hartnett and Bryn Williams (won heat) represent Wales
Gary Rhodes and Atul Kochhar (won heat) represent South East of England

Final week
The three dishes that have scored the highest for each course in the finals are then put to the public vote. In the first series, it was decided that a chef could only win one course overall, therefore any chef who won the public vote for a particular course was then eliminated from any subsequent courses they had been shortlisted for. As the results for all four courses were announced on the same day, some chefs were eliminated under this rule.

Final result
Starter: Richard Corrigan – Smoked salmon with Irish soda bread, woodland sorrel and cress (recipe)
Fish: Bryn Williams – Pan-fried turbot with cockles and oxtail (recipe)
Main: Nick Nairn – Loin of roe venison with rosti, celeriac, cabbage, carrot and game gravy  (recipe)
Dessert: Marcus Wareing – Custard tart with Garibaldi biscuits (recipe)

Great British Christmas Menu (2006)
From 11 to 15 December 2006, a special Christmas series was shown. This involved the four winning chefs creating a four course Christmas dinner that viewers could prepare at home.

Unlike the original series, only one chef was able to be crowned the winner and there was no special prize at stake (i.e. the meal would not be cooked for the Queen). The final result was decided by the judges and a viewers' vote; 30p from calls made in order to vote was donated to Children in Need.

Final result
1st – Richard Corrigan (Northern Ireland)
2nd – Marcus Wareing (England), Nick Nairn (Scotland)
4th – Bryn Williams (Wales)

Series 2 (2007)
Broadcasting of series 2 started on 2 April 2007. The format was the same as before, with the winning chefs from each region from series one taking on new challengers. The final menu was cooked at the British Embassy in Paris at an Ambassadors' Dinner.

Contestants
Week 1 – 2 April to 6 April – Galton Blackiston and Sat Bains (won heat) represent the Midlands and the East of England
Week 2 – 9 April to 13 April – Bryn Williams (won heat) and Matt Tebbutt represent Wales
Week 3 – 16 April to 20 April – Nick Nairn and Jeremy Lee (won heat) represent Scotland
Week 4 – 23 April to 27 April – Richard Corrigan (won heat) and Noel McMeel represent Northern Ireland
Week 5 – 30 April to 4 May – Atul Kochhar (won heat) and Stuart Gillies represent the South East of England
Week 6 – 7 May to 11 May – Michael Caines and Mark Hix (won heat) represent the South West of England
Week 7 – 14 May to 18 May – Marcus Wareing and Mark Broadbent (won heat) represent the North of England

Final week
The rule to eliminate a winning chef of one course from any subsequent courses was dropped, as highlighted by Mark Hix winning both the main course and dessert.

Final result
Starter: Sat Bains – Ham, egg and peas (recipe)
Fish: Richard Corrigan – Whole poached wild salmon and duck egg dressing with wheaten bread and country butter (recipe)
Main: Mark Hix – Rabbit and crayfish stargazy pie (recipe)
Dessert: Mark Hix – Perry jelly and summer fruits with elderflower ice cream (recipe)

Series 3 (2008)
Broadcasting of series 3 began on 17 March 2008. The chefs competed for the opportunity to cook a four-course dinner held in June 2008, at the restaurant at the top of the iconic "Gherkin" building in London. The host was the chef Heston Blumenthal and his guests included top chefs from around the world along with gourmets and celebrities who represent a cross section of modern Britain.

The series began with seven special programmes in which Great British Menu judge Matthew Fort travelled around the UK, selecting the two chefs who would go through to represent their region in the competition.

Contestants
Southwest: Richard Guest, Chris Horridge, Elisha Carter and Chris Wicks
Northern Ireland: Danny Millar, Noel McMeel, Liz Moore and Nick Price
London and the South-east: Jason Atherton, Jake Watkins, Adebola Adeshina and Atul Kochhar
Wales: Angela Hartnett, Chris Chown, Stephen Terry and James Sommerin
North: Mark Broadbent, Michael Wignall, Nigel Haworth and Anthony Flinn
Scotland: Michael Smith, Matthew Gray, Tony Singh and Tom Kitchin
Central region: Aaron Patterson, Sat Bains, Rupert Rowley and Glynn Purnell

Heats
Central region: Sat Bains vs Glynn Purnell (Winner)
Wales: Angela Hartnett vs Stephen Terry (Winner)
North of England: Nigel Haworth (Winner) vs Anthony Flinn
Scotland: Tom Kitchin (Winner) vs Matt Gray
Northern Ireland: Danny Millar (Winner) vs Noel McMeel
South-West: Chris Horridge (Winner) vs Elisha Carter
South-East: Jason Atherton (Winner) vs Atul Kochhar

Final week
Starting from this series, all dishes scored by the judges in the finals are sent to public vote.

Final result
Starter: Jason Atherton – Bacon, lettuce and tomato with croque monsieur (recipe)
Fish: Stephen Terry – Organic salmon and smoked salmon with crab fritters and cockle 'popcorn' (recipe)
Main: Jason Atherton – Dexter beef fillet, ox cheek, smoked potato puree and marrow bone (recipe)
Dessert: Glynn Purnell – Strawberries with tarragon and black pepper honeycomb with burnt English cream surprise (recipe)

Series 4 (2009)
Series 4 began on 30 March 2009 and revolved around cooking a meal for British service personnel (sailors/marines/soldiers/airmen and women) returning from the War in Afghanistan. A chef from a previous series came back in this series to act as a mentor, giving the two chefs from their region guidance and advice. They were in the kitchen and acted as an unofficial fourth judge.

The North region was split this time into two groups: North-East and North-West.

Heats
Central: Glynn Purnell (won heat) vs Daniel CliffordSat Bains as mentor
Scotland: Tom Kitchin (won heat) vs Alan MurchisonJeremy Lee as mentor
North East: Kenny Atkinson (won heat) vs Ian MatfinMarcus Wareing as mentor
Northern Ireland: Danny Millar (won heat) vs Clare SmythRichard Corrigan as mentor
South West: Shaun Rankin (won heat) vs Nathan OutlawMark Hix as mentor
Wales: James Sommerin (won heat) vs Stephen TerryBryn Williams as mentor
North West: Nigel Haworth (won heat) vs Aiden ByrneMarcus Wareing as mentor
South East: Tristan Welch (won heat) vs Mark SargeantJason Atherton as mentor

Final week

Final result
Starter: Kenny Atkinson – Salad of Aberdeen Angus beef, carrots, horseradish and Shetland Black potatoes (recipe)
Fish: Glynn Purnell – Masala spiced monkfish with red lentils, pickled carrots and coconut (recipe)
Main: Nigel Haworth – Lonk lamb Lancashire hotpot, pickled red cabbage, carrots and leeks (Northcote | Luxury Hotel and Michelin Star Restaurant in Lancashire)
Dessert: Shaun Rankin – Treacle tart with Jersey clotted cream and raspberry ripple coulis (recipe)

Series 5 (2010)
Series 5 began on 6 April 2010 with a double episode. In this series, the participating chefs were challenged to find food producers they had not previously used, basing their search around a National Trust property in their region, with the aim to source as many of their ingredients as possible from the property itself or the surrounding area. The banquet was for producers of British food and The Prince of Wales was the guest of honour.

Heats
The format of the heats changed this year. Instead of only two chefs being present for all the heats for their region, in this year three chefs competed in the "courses" section of their heats, with two going forward to cook for the judges in the "judging" episode. As in series four, a previous participant returned each week, but with the added responsibility of scoring each chef's four courses. The chef with the lowest score at the end of the "courses" episodes was eliminated, and the remaining two cooked for the judges.

Final week
In the final week running up to the banquet, the chefs cooked one course per day. Starting from this series, a fourth judge was introduced to score the dishes alongside the judges, replacing public vote.

Instead of being ranked from first to eighth place, the top three chefs were all given a possible dish at the banquet, thus allowing the judges to have more choice when choosing the menu at the end of the week.

Guest judges
 Starter: Richard Corrigan
 Fish: Glynn Purnell
 Main: Jason Atherton
 Dessert: Marcus Wareing

Final result
Starter: Lisa Allen – Wild rabbit and leek turnover with piccalilli (recipe)
Fish: Kenny Atkinson – Mackerel with gooseberries (recipe)
Main: Tom Kerridge – Slow-cooked Aylesbury duck with duck fat chips and gravy (recipe)
Dessert: Niall McKenna – Poached rhubarb with strawberry jelly, yellow man and lavender ice-cream (recipe)

Great British Waste Menu (2010)
A one-off, 90 minute documentary-style programme was broadcast in December 2010, Great British Waste Menu was made to highlight and discourage food wastage in Britain. In addition to showing several examples of such wastage, the programme challenged four chefs (GBM regulars Richard Corrigan and Angela Hartnett, plus Matt Tebbutt and Simon Rimmer) to create a three-course menu plus canapes from food destined to be discarded by producers, supermarkets, restaurants and regular households. Regular series judges Matthew Fort, Oliver Peyton and Prue Leith and the series's special guest, food critic Jay Rayner, judged the results. The final menu, served as a banquet for sixty people, comprised:

Starter: Samosa canapes (Simon Rimmer)
Fish: Fresh Kent fish wrapped in courgette with a pork ratatouille (Richard Corrigan)
Main: British beef with a beef consommé and summer vegetables (Matt Tebutt)
Dessert: Ginger floating island with British summer fruits (Angela Hartnett)
Dustbin Award (for best overall dish): Richard Corrigan

Series 6 (2011)
Series 6 of The Great British Menu started on 4 April 2011. The theme for the series was sharing and communities, with chefs being asked to cook food that encouraged people to come together. During the series, chefs visited and cooked for a number of community groups.

The filming started on 15 March 2011.

Heats

Final week
In the final week running up to the banquet the chefs cooked one course per day but instead of being ranked first to eighth place the top three chefs were all given a possible dish at the banquet, thus allowing the judges to have more choice when choosing the menu at the end of the week.

Guest judges
 Starter: Glynn Purnell
 Fish: Richard Corrigan
 Main: Marcus Wareing
 Dessert: Angela Hartnett

Final result
Starter: Chris Fearon – "Season, Shake and Curry On coronation chicken"
Fish: Aktar Islam – "Sea bass with battered soft shell crab"
Main: Tom Kerridge – "Hog roast"
Dessert: Paul Ainsworth – "Taste of the Fairground"

This result made Tom Kerridge the first chef on the Great British Menu to cook the main course twice, as well as being the first chef to cook a pork dish for the main course on the final menu.

Series 7 (2012)
Series 7 of The Great British Menu began on 9 April 2012 with Scotland being the first region to cook. The theme for the series was the Olympics to celebrate the games coming to London. The chefs were tasked with creating a menu that captured the Olympic spirit and during the series they met up with Olympians from the UK to gain inspiration and advice for their menu.

Heats

Final week
in the final week, the winning eight chefs battled for their dishes to be part of the final banquet menu. Each day, the chefs cooked one of their courses for the four judges, who each marked the dish out of a possible ten points. The three highest-scoring dishes for each course went forward for consideration for the final menu. Unlike previous finals weeks, the judges eliminated some dishes based on their performance in the previous round; unless the chefs had made significant changes in response to the feedback received at the regional final, the judges did not wish to taste and score the unsuitable course a second time. The Olympic banquet was shown in the final show, which was broadcast on 8 June, with all four dishes being prepared and presented for 100 guests.

Guest judges
 Starter: Richard Corrigan
 Fish: Marcus Wareing
 Main: Tom Kerridge
 Dessert: Angela Hartnett

Final result
Starter: Colin McGurran – "Quails in the Wood" (recipe)
Fish: Phil Howard – Cornish mackerel with oysters, mussels, winkles and samphire (recipe)
Main: Daniel Clifford – Slow poached chicken, sweetcorn egg, spinach with bacon and peas (recipe)
Dessert: Simon Rogan – Poached pears, atsina cress snow, sweet cheese ice cream and rosehip syrup (recipe)

Daniel Clifford was the first person to win the main course with chicken

Series 8 (2013)
Series 8 of The Great British Menu, titled Great British Menu Does Comic Relief, commenced on 28 January 2013, with the banquet hosted for people associated with the Comic Relief charity event, held at the Royal Albert Hall.

Heats

Final week
The final week saw the winning eight chefs battle for their dishes to be part of the final banquet menu, but in the main course, the judges added a ninth "wild card" chef, the defeated Central area finalist, Richard Bainbridge, as they thought that his dish was worthy enough to be included for the banquet. Each day, the chefs cooked one of their courses for the four judges, who each marked the dish out of a possible ten points, but in a twist for this series, all the other chefs marked each other's dishes and put their votes in a ballot box. The average score from the chefs was then added to the scores from the judges, who like in the heats, were joined by a comedy guest for each course.

Guest judges
Starter: Patricia Hodge
Fish: Ronni Ancona
Main: Ade Edmondson
Dessert: Charlie Higson

The three highest-scoring dishes for each course went forward for consideration for the final menu, but in a final twist, as the judges could not decide which dessert dish should go to the banquet, they decided that both Richard and Daniel's dishes deserved to be put forward to the banquet, with them serving to half the guests each. The Comic Relief banquet was shown in the final show, which was broadcast on 29 March, with all five dishes being prepared and presented for 80 guests.

Final result
Starter: Tom Aikens – "Chicken Egg, Egg Chicken"
Fish: Aiden Byrne – "Prawn Cocktail"
Main: Michael Smith – "I Love Kids, But I Couldn't Eat a Whole One"
Dessert: Richard Davies and Daniel Clifford – "Strawberries and Cream" and "Going Out With A Bang"

Series 9 (2014)
Series 9 of The Great British Menu, titled Great British Menu: The D-Day Banquet, commenced on 7 April 2014, with the banquet hosted for people who fought on D-Day, of which it was the 70th anniversary in 2014. The banquet was broadcast on 6 June. It was held at St. Paul's Cathedral.

Heats

Final week
In the final week, the winning nine chefs battled for their dishes to be part of the final banquet menu, but in the dessert, Tom Sellers was taken ill, so only  eight chefs competed on that day. Each day, the chefs cooked one of their courses for the four judges, who each marked the dish out of a possible ten points, and like the last series, all the other chefs marked each other's dishes and put their votes in a ballot box. The average score from the chefs was then added to the scores from the judges, who like in the heats, were joined by a D-Day veteran for each course. One other added twist was that before the final marks were given, the chefs and judges each saw what the top three would have been if only the chefs were marking.

Guest judges
Starter: George Batts
Fish: Ken Sturdy
Main: Baroness Trumpington
Dessert: Celia Sandys

The three highest-scoring dishes for each course went forward for consideration for the final menu. The D-Day banquet was shown in the final show, which was broadcast on 6 June, with all four dishes being prepared and presented for the veterans and special guest, David Cameron.

Final result
Starter: Adam Simmonds – "Your Share"
Fish: Emily Watkins – "We Shall Fight Them On The Beaches"
Main: James Durrant – "Blitz Spirit"
Dessert: Colin McGurran – "Homage To The Dickin Medal"

Series 10 (2015)
On 10 June 2015, it was announced that Series 10 of Great British Menu would be broadcast "later in the summer" with the chefs battling it out to cook a course at the banquet at Drapers' Hall in London to celebrate 100 years of the Women's Institute. The series eventually began on 3 August 2015.

Heats

Final week
In the final week, the winning eight chefs battled for their dishes to be part of the final banquet menu. Each day, the chefs cooked one of their courses for the four judges, who each marked the dish out of a possible ten points, and like the previous two series, all the other chefs would be marking each other's dishes and putting their votes in a ballot box. The average score from the chefs was then added to the scores from the judges, who like in the heats, were joined by a WI member for each course. Another added twist was that before the final marks were given, the chefs and judges each saw what the top three would have been if only the chefs were marking.

In another twist for this series, due to the fact that the chefs are cooking for the WI, the judges revealed that only "perfect dishes" would make the shortlist, and unlike the mandatory three in the previous series, for some courses, there might be more or less than that.

Guest judges
Starter: Angela Baker
Fish: Kirsty Bowen
Main: Felicity Cloake
Dessert: Mary Gwynn

The shortlisted dishes for each course went forward for consideration for the final menu. The WI Centenary banquet was shown in the final show, which was broadcast on 9 October, with all four dishes being prepared and presented for the WI guests.

Final result
Starter: Rich Bainbridge – "We All Stand For Jerusa-lamb"
Fish: Michael O'Hare – "Emancipation"
Main: Matt Gillan – "Teaching And Preaching"
Dessert: Rich Bainbridge – "Inspiring Women"

Series 11 (2016)
On 30 May 2016, it was announced that Series 11 of Great British Menu would also be broadcast "later in the summer" with the chefs this time cooking in the dining room of the House of Commons in London to celebrate the "Great Britons" of Elizabeth II. The series began on 29 August 2016.

Heats

Final week
In the final week, the winning eight chefs battled for their dishes to be part of the final banquet menu. Each day, the chefs cooked one of their courses for the four judges, who each marked the dish out of a possible ten points, and like recent series, all the other chefs marked each other's dishes and put their votes in a ballot box. The average score from the chefs was then added to the scores from the judges, who like in the heats, were joined by a veteran for each course. As with recent series, before the final marks were given, the chefs and judges each saw what the top three would have been if only the chefs were marking.

Guest judges
Starter: Lady Claire MacDonald OBE
Fish: Tim Hayward
Main: John Williams
Dessert: Grace Dent

As with the previous series, if certain dishes were thought to be more banquet-worthy than all the other dishes, then the dishes would immediately advance to the banquet.

Final result
Starter: Mark Abbott – "Ordinary To Extraordinary"
Fish: Tommy Banks – "Preserving The Future"
Main: Mark Froydenlund – "A Celebration Of Rose Veal"
Dessert: Adam Reid – "Golden Empire"

Series 12 (2017)
The chefs had to cook for a banquet in celebration of the 140th anniversary of Wimbledon. This was the first series with Andi Oliver as a judge, replacing Prue Leith.

Heats

Final week
In the final week, the winning eight chefs battled for their dishes to be part of the final banquet menu. Each day, the chefs cooked one of their courses for the four judges, who each marked the dish out of a possible ten points, but in a change to recent series, the chefs no longer had a vote on the dishes. In a further twist, the result for each course was announced at the end of each day, rather than a shortlist of a few dishes being carried forward to the end of the week. In the event of a dead heat, the three regular judges would decide which dish went through to the banquet.

Guest judges
Starter: Sue Barker
Fish: Tim Henman
Main: Gordon Reid
Dessert: Annabel Croft

Final result
Starter: Pip Lacey – "Whatever The Weather"
Fish: Tommy Banks – "Turbot With Strawberries & Cream"
Main: Michael Bremner – "The Grass Is Greener"
Dessert: Selin Kiazim – "Honouring Venus Rosewater Champions"

Series 13 (2018)
The 2018 Great British Menu was about celebrating 70 years of the National Health Service (NHS), with 24 chefs attempting to win a place on the final banquet menu, to cook "A Feast To Say Thank You" for people of the NHS to be held in the Great Hall of St Bartholomew's Hospital.

Heats

Final week
In the final week, the winning nine chefs battle for their dishes to be part of the final banquet menu. Each day, the chefs cooked one of their courses for the four judges, who each marked the dish out of a possible ten points. As with the previous series, the chefs no longer had a vote on the dishes, and the result for each course was announced at the end of each day, rather than a shortlist of a few dishes being carried forward to the end of the week. In the event of a dead heat, the three regular judges would decide which dish went through to the banquet. After the four winning chefs had been announced, the judges revealed that for the first time ever, the guests at the banquet would vote for their favourite dish and a Champion of Champions would be crowned.

Guest judges
Starter: Rangan Chatterjee
Fish: Chris Ogden
Main: Tom Lynch
Dessert: Professor Jacqueline Dunkley-Bent

Final Result
Starter: James Cochran – "Cep-tional"
Fish: Ellis Barrie – "Bun in the Oven"
Main: Tom Brown – "Poor Man's Goose"
Dessert: Chris Harrod – "Tea and Cake"
Champion of Champions: James Cochran

Series 14 (2019)
In the 2019 Great British Menu, 24 chefs competed to serve a course at Abbey Road Studios for the 50th anniversary of the last time that The Beatles played together.

The kitchen had moved to a new location in Stratford-upon-Avon and, in a change to the transmissions, instead of being five 30-minute shows broadcast between Monday to Friday, the shows became two 1-hour shows on Wednesday and Thursday, with the starter and fish courses on the Wednesday and the main and dessert courses on Thursday, with the judging being unchanged as a 30-minute show on Fridays.

Heats

Final week
As in the previous series, all eight chefs cooked all their menus and each course winner was picked at the end of each day. Following the announcement of all the course winners, the judges confirmed that they also wanted the chefs to create vegetarian options of their meals and, like the previous year, there was also a "Champion of Champions" vote with all the diners.

Guest judges
Starter: Martin Kemp
Fish: Kanya King (with assistance from Novelist)
Main: Andrew Ridgeley
Dessert: Peter Hook

Final result
Starter: Luke Selby – "The British Invasion"
Fish: Tom Anglesea – "Lost Souls in a Fish Bowl"
Main: Adam Reid – "Comfort Food 'Sounds' Good"
Dessert: Lorna McNee – "Lime and Sunshine, There's Enough for Everyone"
Champion of Champions: Lorna McNee

Series 15 (2020)
In the 2020 Great British Menu, many changes were announced to the format. The comedian Susan Calman became the host and hosted in the kitchens at Stratford-upon-Avon. Also, for the first time since series 3, each region had four chefs, instead of three. Each chef was to cook six courses, instead of the usual four. As well as the traditional starter, fish course, main course and dessert, each chef had to create two other courses, which although not marked by the judges, could be used as a tie-breaker if needed. They were an amuse-bouche at the beginning, and a pre-dessert palate cleanser between the main and dessert courses.

The theme for the series was children's literature with the banquet due to be held at Exeter College, Oxford, and each region had its own sub-theme towards the brief.

As with the previous series, the shows were 1 hour long with the amuse-bouche, starter and fish courses on the Wednesday and the main, pre-dessert and dessert courses on Thursday, with the judging being unchanged as a 30-minute show on Fridays. The main difference was that one chef was eliminated after the fish course on day 1, with another chef eliminated after the dessert on day 2.

Heats

Final week
The winning eight chefs cook their courses in celebration of nearly 200 years of British children's literature.

Guest judges
Starter: Cressida Cowell
Fish: Malorie Blackman
Main: Anthony Horowitz
Dessert: Greg James (with assistance from Chris Smith)

Final result
Amuse-bouche: Ruth Hansom – "Golden Snitch"
Starter: Alex Greene – "The Potato, The Onion, The Cheese and The Wardrobe"
Fish: Niall Keating – "Witches of the Northern Lights"
Main: Tom Barnes – "Beatrix Potter's Herdwick Lamb" 
Pre-dessert: Kerth Gumbs – "Snozzcumbers and Frobscottle"
Dessert: Alex Greene – "The Incredible Edible Book"
Champion of Champions: Niall Keating

Although Ruth Hansom and Kerth Gumbs did not win any of the courses, Ruth's fish course and Kerth's dessert course were the two highest-scoring runners-up, so they were invited to cook the Amuse-bouche and Pre-dessert respectively.

Great British Christmas Menu (2020)
From 1 to 24 December 2020, a special Christmas series was shown. Andi Oliver stepped down from the judging panel and began presenting the series, replacing Susan Calman, and comedian Kerry Godliman took Andi's place as a special guest judge. Twelve previous winners of the show competed to cook their dishes for a six-course banquet originally located at York Hospital. In the first round of each course, various eight of those veteran chefs were selected, and one group of four judges double-blind the other group's dishes in the first rounds. Top three dishes of their respective courses (or four for canapé) are selected for the second round in the judging panel. Godliman is a vegetarian, so chefs cooked vegetarian alternatives of their courses for her.

The main banquet was cancelled due to restrictions during the pandemic, so mini banquets occurred in various areas, while some other units of the six-course meal were home-delivered. The filming of the banquet occurred at a gazebo outside the Hospital under tier-two restrictions during the COVID-19 pandemic.

Guest judges
 Canapé and starter: Vicky Hall
 Fish and main course: Tim Spector
 Dessert and petit four: Beverley Knight

Final result
 Canapé: James Cochran – "T'was the Night Before Christmas"; Alex Greene – "Christmas Tree Bauble"; Lisa Goodwin-Allen – "Retro Christmas Canape"
 Starter: Alex Greene – "Not Mushroom under this Tree"
 Fish: Tom Barnes – "Smoked Salmon Over Pine"
 Main course: Lisa Goodwin-Allen – "Christmas Fallow Deer Feast"
 Dessert: Lisa Goodwin-Allen – "Christmas Snowglobe (Thank You)"
 Petit four: Tommy Banks – "The Night Before Christmas"

Series 16 (2021)
Series 16 began on 24 March 2021. The theme of the competition was innovation, celebrating the 30th anniversary of Sir Tim Berners-Lee creation of the World Wide Web. The series also marked the debut of Rachel Khoo as a judge, with Andi Oliver hosting following the series' Christmas Special. The banquet was due to be held at Jodrell Bank Observatory, Cheshire, but as COVID-19 restrictions were still in effect at the time of the series' filming, the banquet was instead held outdoors in a marquee, with full social distancing measures in place.

The first course was referred to as canapés for this season, rather than the amuse-bouche from the last season.

Heats

Final week
The winning eight chefs cook their courses in celebration of British innovation.

Guest judges
Starter: Phil Wang
Fish: Zoe Laughlin
Main: Carol Vorderman
Dessert: Ed Gamble

Final result
Starter: Alex Bond – "The Founding Father"
Palate cleanser: Jude Kereama – "Double Dose Palate Booster"
Fish: Roberta Hall-McCarron – "Maxwell's Colour Wheel"
Main: Oli Marlow – "Special Delivery"
Dessert: Dan McGeorge – "Give A Dog A Bone"
Petit four: Jude Kereama – "Planetary Petit Four"
Champion of Champions: Dan McGeorge

The Canapé and the Pre-dessert were not scored but were awarded to Jude Kereama as the highest runner-up. However, Jude's canapé was changed to be served as a palate cleanser after Alex's starter, and Jude's pre-dessert was changed to be served as a petit four after Dan's dessert.

Series 17 (2022)
Series 17 began on 1 February 2022. The theme of the competition is Great British Broadcasting, coinciding with the 100 year anniversary of the BBC beginning radio broadcasts. The series also saw a whole new judging panel with Ed Gamble, Nisha Katona and former GBM champion Tom Kerridge becoming the new judges, whilst Andi Oliver remained as host. The banquet was held at Alexandra Palace, London, where the BBC's first television broadcast took place in 1936.

In another change to recent series, the heats were shown on Tuesday–Thursday, and the judging episode was extended from a 30 minute episode to a 1 hour episode.

For the first time ever on the series, one of regional heats (South West) consists of all four female chefs in the line-up.

Heats

Final week
The winning eight chefs cook their courses in celebration of British broadcasting.

Guest judges
Starter: Steve Pemberton
Fish: Floella Benjamin
Main: Alison Steadman
Dessert: Huw Edwards

Final result
Canapé: Sally Abé – (Tarlet of whipped chicken with elderberry and port jelly)
Starter: Nathan Davies – "Merlin's Potion"
Fish: Spencer Metzger – "Be Careful What You Fish For"
Main: Spencer Metzger – "First Impressions"
Pre-dessert: Sally Abé – (Yoghurt sorbet ice lolly, based around It's a Sin)
Dessert: Chris McClurg – "A 'Trifle' Derry Girls"
Champion of Champions: Spencer Metzger ("Be Careful What You Fish For")

Sally Abé was the highest placed chef not to cook one of the main plates, so she was chosen to cook her canapé and pre-dessert courses.

Series 18 (2023)
Series 18 began on 31 January 2023. The theme of the competition is British Animation & Illustration, coinciding with the 65th anniversary of the creation of Paddington Bear. The judges and host remained the same as 2022, although for the South West Judging episodes, Marcus Wareing substituted for Tom Kerridge.

Heats

Transmissions

See also
 List of Great British Menu chefs

References

External links

"How much can it cost chefs to take part in Great British Menu?" (12 June 2017) at The Staff Canteen

2006 British television series debuts
2000s British cooking television series
2010s British cooking television series
2020s British cooking television series
BBC Television shows
British cooking television shows
English-language television shows
Food reality television series
Television series by All3Media
Television series by Optomen
Cooking competitions in the United Kingdom